Mardani is a surname. Notable people with the surname include:

Mehrdad Mardani, Iranian wrestler
Mohammad Ali Mardani (born 1994), Iranian footballer
Mohd Mardani (born 1972), Singaporean footballer
Nasrollah Mardani (1947–2003), Iranian poet
Sajjad Mardani (born 1986), Iranian taekwondo practitioner

Other 

 Mardani Jhumair, folk dance from the Chota Nagpur Plateau in India
 Mardani khel,  Indian martial art from Maharashtra
 Laado 2 – Veerpur Ki Mardani, Indian television series
 Mardaani, 2014 Indian film by Pradeep Sarkar
 Mardaani 2, 2019 Indian film by Gopi Puthran